Phelim Robert Hugh O'Neill, 2nd Baron Rathcavan, PC (NI) (2 November 1909 – 20 December 1994), was a politician in Northern Ireland and a hereditary peer in the British House of Lords.

The son of Hugh O'Neill, a unionist politician, Phelim studied at Eton College before joining the Royal Artillery. He became a major during World War II.

O'Neill was elected to Westminster for the Ulster Unionist Party at the 1952 North Antrim by-election, succeeding his father. He stood down at the 1959 general election. At the 1958 Stormont elections, he was elected, again to represent North Antrim. In 1969, he briefly served as Minister of Education before becoming the Minister of Agriculture. In 1958, he was appointed High Sheriff of Antrim.

O'Neill joined the Alliance Party of Northern Ireland in 1972, and acted as its leader at the Darlington Conference. At the 1973 Northern Ireland Assembly election, he was unsuccessful in North Antrim. In 1982, he succeeded his father as the second Baron Rathcavan.

See also
List of Northern Ireland members of the House of Lords

References

Biographies of Members of the Northern Ireland House of Commons

1909 births
1994 deaths
High Sheriffs of Antrim
People educated at Eton College
Royal Artillery officers
Barons in the Peerage of the United Kingdom
British Army personnel of World War II
Leaders of the Alliance Party of Northern Ireland
Ulster Unionist Party members of the House of Commons of Northern Ireland
Oneill, Phelim
Oneill, Phelim
Oneill, Phelim
Oneill, Phelim
Northern Ireland Cabinet ministers (Parliament of Northern Ireland)
Members of the Privy Council of Northern Ireland
Ulster Unionist Party members of the House of Commons of the United Kingdom
Oneill, Phelim
Oneill, Phelim
UK MPs who inherited peerages
Phelim
Oneill, Phelim
Members of the House of Commons of Northern Ireland for County Antrim constituencies
Alliance Party of Northern Ireland peers
Alliance Party of Northern Ireland members of the House of Commons of Northern Ireland
Ulster Unionist Party hereditary peers